The Gillette Mach3 is a line of razors produced by Gillette.

Production
Prior to the announcement, Gillette built plywood walls around the production lines in its factory in Boston, in order to keep it a secret from many of its own employees. Gillette said its manufacturing plant was capable of producing 250 cartridges per minute.

Trade secret theft 
Steven Davis, a process controls engineer working for a Gillette subcontractor that designed the Mach3, stole information about the Mach3 and faxed it to Gillette's competitors, Warner-Lambert, Bic, and American Safety Razor. Davis pleaded guilty to five counts of stealing Gillette's trade secrets in January 1998. Davis was sentenced to 27 months in prison. Davis said he committed the crime because he was angry at his boss.

Announcement and introduction
Gillette announced the Mach3 razor on April 14, 1998, following more than $750 million in R&D.

Gillette budgeted $300 million for a two year advertising campaign for the Mach3 razor. Gillette marketed the three blade design as allowing for a shave with less pressure to the skin and with fewer strokes, thereby reducing skin irritation. The Mach3 razor was released in North America during the last week of June 1998. It was first sold in Europe in September 1998.

Mach 3 system 
The Mach 3 system is also used in razors offered by other producers like Truefitt & Hill, DR Harris, and Muhle.

References

External links

Procter & Gamble brands
Products introduced in 1998
Personal care brands